Caroline Cellier (7 August 1945 – 15 December 2020) was a French actress.

Personal life
She married the actor Jean Poiret. Their son Nicolas, who was born on 19 November 1978, became a screenwriter and actor. The couple stayed together until Jean's death in March 1992.

Theatre

Filmography

References

External links

1945 births
2020 deaths
French film actresses
Best Supporting Actress César Award winners
Actors from Montpellier
20th-century French actresses
21st-century French actresses
French stage actresses